This is a list of the mammal species recorded on Christmas Island. The island had five native and endemic land mammal species, of which three are now presumed to be extinct. In addition, five wild mammals have been introduced to Christmas Island since settlement.

Carnivora
Introduced cats and dogs are a threat to native wildlife on Christmas Island and can carry potentially dangerous pathogens, such as Leptospira. In 2014, the Australian Government announced a $500,000 investment to help eradicate stray and feral cats on the island, with the aim of complete eradication by 2020. As of 2016, all pet cats on Christmas Island have been registered and de-sexed and no further cats will be permitted onto the island.

Chiroptera

Christmas Island was once home to two native bat species, of which only one is extant. The Christmas Island pipistrelle was endemic to the island until 2009, when the last individual was recorded. In 2016, the species was assessed as extinct by the International Union for Conservation of Nature. The remaining native bat species Pteropus natalis (Christmas Island flying fox) is classified as critically endangered.

Eulipotyphla

The Christmas Island shrew, once abundant on the island, has been very rare since the early twentieth century. Since 1909, only four confirmed individuals have been recorded: two in 1958, and two in 1985.

Rodentia

At the time of human settlement, Christmas Island hosted two endemic rodents, the bulldog rat and Maclear's rat. However, both species were extinct by 1908. There is evidence that black rats, introduced to the island in 1899, carried the infectious parasite Trypanosoma lewisi, which was fatal to the native rodents.

Cetacea

Sirenia

See also
 List of birds of Christmas Island
 List of mammals of the Cocos (Keeling) Islands

References

Further reading
 

mam
Mammals
Christmas Island
Christmas Island